The Women's 100m breaststroke event at the 2010 South American Games was held on March 29, with the heats at 10:54 and the Final at 18:20.

Medalists

Records

Results

Heats

Final

References
Heats
Final

Breaststroke 100m W